This page details the match results and statistics of the Tahiti national football team from 1952 to 1999.

The Tahiti national football team is the national team of French Polynesia and is controlled by the Fédération Tahitienne de Football. The team consists of a selection of players from French Polynesia, not just Tahiti.

Tahiti played their first full match on 21 September 1952 when they recorded a 2–2 draw at home against New Zealand. Their first competitive match came almost 11 years later when they entered the South Pacific Games for the first time in 1963. Finishing third, Tahiti set a new record winning margin for the national team as they defeated the Solomon Islands 18–0. This was bettered at the 1971 Games when Tahiti recorded a 30–0 win over the Cook Islands.

In 1973, Tahiti competed in the inaugural OFC Nations Cup in New Zealand. Reaching the final following an undefeated group stage, Tahiti lost 2–0 to the hosts New Zealand.

Key

Key to matches
Att.=Match attendance
(H)=Home ground
(A)=Away ground
(N)=Neutral ground

Key to record by opponent
Pld=Games played
W=Games won
D=Games drawn
L=Games lost
GF=Goals for
GA=Goals against

Results

Tahiti's score is shown first in each case.

Notes

Record by opponent

References

Tahiti national football team results